Tallassee Airport is a closed airport located  south of Tallassee, Alabama, United States.

History 
The airport was built about 1941 as one of two satellite airfields to the Army pilot school at Tuskegee Army Airfield. It was designated Griel Army Auxiliary Airfield #1 and was named after the original landowner.

After the war the airfield reverted to private ownership and became Tallassee Airport.   Not much is known about the airport, which was closed sometime during the 1970s.

Today, the airfield appears to be part of a light industrial estate. The remains of the runway are clearly visible in aerial photography.

See also

 Alabama World War II Army Airfields

References 

 Abandoned & Little-Known Airfields: Tallassee Airport, Tallassee, AL

External links 

Defunct airports in Alabama
Airfields of the United States Army Air Forces in Alabama
Airports in Alabama
Transportation buildings and structures in Tallapoosa County, Alabama